The Rose Memorial Auditorium (Rose Memorial or Rose) is a large multi-purpose theater (auditorium) on the campus of Central Philippine University in Jaro, Iloilo City. Rose is the largest auditorium and theater in Western Visayas with a seating capacity of 4000 and has hosted several international and local concerts, conventions and events from known from music groups and singers, and as well as conventions and summits of known public servants and organizations.

It was built as a memorial in honor of Francis H. Rose, one of American founding fathers of Central Philippine University along with the Hopevale Martyrs who died during the World War II.

The present day structure was built in the 1990s after the old one was burned down by fire. Recently, the Cultural Center of the Philippines has designated the Rose Memorial Auditorium for three-year Memorandum of Understanding, as one of the first batch of nine Cultural Center of the Philippines Regional Art Centers or Kaisa sa Sining Regional Art Centers in 2014.

With exception to the concerts that Rose hosts, it is also the venue for religious convocations of Central Philippine University and an biennial convention of the Convention of Philippine Baptist Churches.

Notable concerts, summits and conventions

Since the 1990s when the new Rose Memorial was opened to the public and university use of Central Philippine University, it became a known venue in Iloilo for performances of notable international and local bands (rock, pop, acoustic and group), recording artists/singers, other music groups, and as well as symposiums, summits and conventions of public servants and organizations.

Bands

 M.Y.M.P. 
 Hale (band)

Singers/Celebrities

 Sharon Cuneta
 Sarah Geronimo 
 Zsa Zsa Padilla
 Christian Bautista
 John Ford Coley

Politicians, public servants and known personas in various sectors

 Gloria Macapagal Arroyo - former president of the Philippines.
 Gina Lopez - environmentalist and former environment secretary under President Rodrigo Duterte.
 Arthur Defensor Sr. - former governor of Iloilo and congressman.
 Oscar M. Lopez - chairman, Lopez Group of Companies.

Singing groups and others

 The Carpenters
 Don Moen
 Platters
 The Cascades
 Philippine Madrigal Singers

References

Theatres completed in the 19th century
Central Philippine University
History of the Philippines (1898–1946)
Theaters in the Philippines
Buildings and structures in Iloilo City
19th-century religious buildings and structures in the Philippines